Springvale White Eagles Football Club is a semi-professional Australian soccer club based in Melbourne, Victoria currently playing in the NPL Victoria 3. Founded by Serbian Australians, they play at the Serbian Sports Centre in Keysborough, Victoria.

They were founded in 1975 and were in the Victorian Premier League from 1997 to 1999, 2007 and 2011.

History
Springvale White Eagles Club was formed in 1975 as Springvale United, and have been known by their current name since 1995.

In 2002 White Eagles got into the State League Cup Final, losing 4–2 to Westvale.

In June 2007, the coach Leon Gardikiotis resigned less than a month after replacing from Zoran Trajceski. The club president Zoran Stojanovic also resigned. In 2008, Springvale White Eagles appointed former Frankston Pines coach Stan Webster, who experienced little success at the club.

The club was promoted to the Victorian Premier League in 2010, but suffered relegation in their first season in the top flight in the following year.

In 2012 Springvale were relegated from State League 1, having finished bottom of the league with just 1 win in 22 league games. − They took out the State League 2 South-East title the following season, pipping Dandenong City SC by one point.

National Premier Leagues Victoria (2014–present)
The club entered the National Premier Leagues Victoria 2 division for the 2014 season, the new second tier of soccer in Victoria. The club finished the season in 12th place in the 14 team league, just avoiding the relegation playoffs.

In 2015, the NPL 2 was split into an East and West division with the White Eagles competing in the East division, finishing in nineteenth place overall in the NPL1 league system. Late in October 2015, head manager Zlatko Mihajlović resigned from his position. Shortly after, Mihajlović  was replaced by Boyan Mitkov as the new senior head coach. Springvale then lost key player Šimo Jovanović to Kingston City. Jovanović had spent his entire career with the White Eagles, progressing through the youth system to eventually become the club's captain. On 12 April 2016, it was announced that Mitkov and his assistant Gus Caminos (who were winless in their first seven league games in the NPL2 season) had resigned from their positions, with former White Eagles player Nik Kovacevic announced as the replacement.  Springvale subsequently finished the season in 6th place in the NPL2 East, its second best-ever finish in the NPL2 competition. In November 2016, head coach Kovacevic departed the club to return to Pascoe Vale as a senior assistant coach.

Springvale White Eagles appointed former Altona Magic coach Vlado Tortevski as their new manager for the 2017 NPL2 season. Despite winning three of their opening four NPL2 league games, Tortevski's side then won just one of the following ten, leading to the departure of the head coach in May 2017. The White Eagles finished the season in 7th place.

For the 2018 season, Springvale reappointed former club coach Nik Kovacevic to lead the team, and had a total of 7 key signings in the off-season. This included the experienced central defensive partnership of Pavle Durkic (formerly at Whittlesea Ranges FC) and  Milos Tošić (formerly at West Adelaide SC). Also adding to the squad were Andy Kecojević, Marcus Dimanche, Delarno Pharoe, Slaven Vranešević and Englishmen Luke Barrow. With the mid-season loss of Captain Dejan Erakovic the Eagles brought in other key signings to its squad, including Bonel Obradović, Nemanja Lojanica and Nenad Nikolic. The Eagles finished the 2018 campaign in fourth place in the NPL2 East, its best finish since the inception of the NPL in 2014.

In 2019 the club finished in last place, with just four wins in 28 games, and were relegated to NPL3 for the 2020 season. Head coach Nebojsa Vukosavljevic resigned after the club's relegation, with Springvale appointing former Socceroo John Markovski for the 2020 NPL3 campaign.

Achievements

League

Cup

Victorian Premier League
 Highest finish: 6th in 1997
 Season Appearances: 5 Seasons
 Greatest home win: 8–2 against Melton Reds in 1997
 Greatest away win: 6–0 against Westvale in 1999

Notable current and former international players

  Vince Grella
  Rodrigo Vargas
  U20 Ricky Diaco
  U20 Miloš Lujić
  U20 Zlatko Mihajlović
  U20 Bonel Obradović
  Nebojša Pejić
  Kenny Athiu
  Taban Makoii

Individual awards
Bill Fleming Medal – 
Media voted VPL Player of the Year
 1999 – Zlatko Mihajlović

Club Top Goal Scorers 
 
 2021 - Andrija Kecojevic - 5
 2020 - Cancelled due to COVID-19
 2019 - Taban Makoii - 7
 2018 - Damir Stoilovic - 9
 2017 - Damir Stoilovic - 10
 2016 - Damir Stoilovic - 16
 2015 – Hernan de Rito – 6
 2014 – Vojislav Milojević – 11
 2013 – Stephane Leblond – 15
 2012 – Philip Ajao – 5
 2011 – Goran Zoric – 8
 2010 – Nenad Pavasovic –  8
 2009 – Zoran Vukas – 6
 2008 – Grujo Mrdić –  7
 2007 – Goran Zorić – 5
 2006 – Nikolaos Papadopoulos – 11
 2005 – Sastre Teyedor Juan – 11
 2004 – Zlatko Mihajlović – 9
 2003 – Ricky Diaco – 12
 2002 – Eric Styczen – 9
 2001 – Nebojsa Kozlica – 6
 2000 – Eric Styczen – 6
 1999 – Zlatko Mihajlović – 10
 1998 – Sasha Nikolić – 4
 1997 – Danny Gnjidić – 14
 1996 – Zlatko Mihajlović – 16
 1995 – Micheal Michalakopoulos – 14
 1994 – Zlatko Mihajlović – 7
 1993 – Zlatko Mihaljović – 11
 1992 – Zlatko Mihaljović – 12
 1991 – Ian Kerezovic – 9

Rivalries

Dandenong Thunder
The teams both situated 6 km apart, the rivalry between the clubs is immense.

On 11 February 2017 The White Eagles hosted The Thunder in the Second Round of the 2017 National Premier Leagues Victoria 2 competition. In front of a healthy contingent of local fans, the White Eagles got off to a perfect start early in the second half with new signing Cody Martindale gaining the lead for the Eagles. With a fiery clash on and off the field referee Alessandro Arbizzani was not holding back on the cautions. With Springvale leading the contest 1–0 in the 60th minute, a brawl erupted in the stands which escalated, forcing the referee to halt proceedings for approximately 10 minutes. In the final stages of the game the Eagles capitalised on a counterattack with goal scorer Tapiwanashe Munyanyiwa finishing a great move by the Eagles. Late in the game there was drama, with Springvale Player Nebojsa Pejić putting one in his own net bringing back the game to 2–1. The Eagles hung on for a vital three points, winning its first two games off the 2017 season under Vlado Tortevski. They later faced Dandenong at George Andrews Reserve in Round 17 losing 4–0.

Melbourne Knights
The teams were both in the Victorian Premier League in the 2007 and 2011 seasons.

St Albans Saints
These 2 clubs first met in the Victorian Premier league on 22 March 1997. The game was played in the Serbian Sports Centre where White Eagles recorded a 3–1 win. In that match, St Albans took the lead in the 43 minutes with a goal by Idriz Peja. White Eagles Jim Gacovski levelled the score in the 83rd minute. Anthony Burlak scored in the 89th minute and Nick Kovacevic in the 90th minute to give White Eagles a memorable 3–1 victory.

In Round 12 on 12 May 2019 in the NPL 2 season the eagles travelled to Churchill Reserve & took all three points back to White Eagles Stadium in a thrilling 2–1 win with goals to Taban Makoii from the penalty spot (19th minute) and Gerry Kavadas (21st minute). A win for the Eagles after a long unsuccessful period at Churchill Reserve in over 7 years.

North Sunshine Eagles
The teams were first met on 16 April 2021 in National Premier Leagues Victoria 3 competition.

Stadium

White Eagles play at the Serbian Sports Centre (Srpski Sportski Centar).

Current squad

Squad correct at 9 May 2022.

Competition timeline

Managerial history 

  Gus MacLeod (1987–1996)
  Dušan Kalezić (1997–1998)
  John Gardiner (1998)
  Miloš Nasić (1999)
  Bobby McLaughlin (1999)
  Zoran Trajčevski (2006–2007)
  Vlado Zorić (2007)
 / Leon Gardikiotis (2007)
  James Sid (2007)
  Stan Webster (2008)
 / Zlatko Mihajlović (2008–2011)
 / Bojo Jevdjevic (2012)
 / Zlatko Mihajlović (2013–2015)
 / Boyan Mitkov (2015–2016)
 / Nik Kovačević (2016)
 / Vlado Tortevski (2017)
 / Nik Kovačević (2018–2019)
 / Nebojša Vukosavljević (2019)
 / John Markovski (2020)
 / Artour Kirichian (2021–2022)
 / Darko Djurić (2022-)

External links
 Official website
Football Federation Victoria Official website
Serbian Sports Centre – Official Website

References

Soccer clubs in Melbourne
Victorian State League teams
Victorian Premier League teams
National Premier Leagues clubs
Serbian sports clubs in Australia
Association football clubs established in 1975
1975 establishments in Australia
Sport in the City of Greater Dandenong